Vasileios Nektarios Sagonas (born 28 January 1983) known professionally as V-Sag is a Greek music producer, pianist, DJ and music teacher.

Early life 
Sagonas learned how to use computers at an early age, and learned to compose music using Digital Audio Workstations. He came out as gay to his friends and family on his early teens and as a shy person he started expressing his feelings through music.

Career 
In 2006, Sagonas released a single Fossil at Pure Substance record label and started touring around the world. The same year, Hernan Cattaneo picked Sagonas' single I Wasn't Impressed Enough as one of his favorites which was released on Dave Seaman's record label, Audio Therapy (record label). In 2008, he collaborated with the record labels Armada Music, EMI and Universal and gained significance success with his release Feather. In the same year he composed the titles music of the soundtrack of the movie Alter Ego starring the Greek singer Sakis Rouvas. Quinlan Road, the record label of the singer Loreena Mckennitt signed V-Sag and released his remix of the song Marrakesh Nigh Market. He then recreated a version of I Totally Miss You of the 80s band Bad Boys Blue and included it on his album Feather with the official license of their label Universal Music Group. He composed the albums Heartfeels, Out Of My Way and Emotions.

In 2013 he performed live at Athens Concert Hall with Alexandra McKay  and in 2017 with his release Lonely, gained attention of the Greek music industry, which was included as soundtrack at MEGA Channel Cinema prime advertisement spot and trended #1 on Greek Shazam and YouTube.

As of 2021, V-Sag collaborated with Shaya (singer) and has released 8 albums by The Sound Of Everything UK in collaboration with The Orchard and Sony Music. His latest album Offline has been characterised as innovating by being the first Dolby Atmos production that has been composed by a Greek music producer.

Discography

References

1983 births
Living people
People from Larissa
Greek DJs
Greek electronic musicians
21st-century Greek male musicians
Greek gay musicians